Mahmut L. Ünlü (born 30 March 1967) is a Turkish business executive and entrepreneur. Mahmut L. Ünlü who established ÜNLÜ & Co, is currently acting as  the Chairman and CEO of the company.

Education 
Ünlü was born in Istanbul, Turkey, where he completed his high school education. He was the co-president of the Student Council as well as the member of athletics team and the National Champion folklore team. Ünlü studied Mechanical Engineering in Boğaziçi University between 1985-1988. Then he continued his education in Georgia Institute of Technology, Atlanta, where he graduated from the Mechanical Engineering Department in 1989. He received his MBA degree in Finance and Entrepreneurship from Rice University, Houston, Texas in 1991.

Career 
Mahmut Ünlü started his career as an Associate in ‘İktisat Bankası’ in 1992 where he worked on major privatization projects, issuance of the first Asset Back Security in the Turkish capital markets as well as a number of corporate bonds. He also managed an equity fund during his assignment. He left İktisat Bank for Yatırım Bank at the end of 1992 and he was promoted to Deputy General Manager of the Bank in 1994. He established the corporate finance, research and institutional capital markets departments. He helped the bank to become the market leader in IPO’S and corporate finance M&A advisory in 1994-1995. He left Yatırım Bank to establish Dundas Ünlü & Co  in 1996, In the partnership with Alasdair Dundas to offer independent financial advisory services. In 2002, Mahmut L. Ünlü and his partners acquired Işıklar Menkul Değerler, a local broker, to offer a wider range of investment banking services. In 2007, Standard Bank London became a partner by acquiring around 67% shareholding in Dundas Ünlü from Alasdair Dundas and Tahincioğlu Group, which complemented the business with a global network and the company was renamed "Standard Ünlü", where he continued to serve as CEO.
Between 2007 and 2012, Mahmut L. He was a member of the International EXCO in Standard Bank, acting also as the Standard Bank representative in Turkey. In 2012, he  became the majority shareholder of Standard Ünlü by acquiring the majority of Standard Bank's shares and renamed the group as ÜNLÜ & Co. He is currently serving as the chairman and CEO of the company. He is a member of Young Entrepreneurship Council of TOBB (Turkish: Union of Chambers Commodity Exchanges).

Personal life 
Mr. Ünlü is married to Şebnem Kalyoncuoğlu Ünlü and he lives in Istanbul with his family. Among his civic activities, Ünlü is an admirer of Contemporary and Oriental Arts. Both he and his wife support contemporary artists. Ünlü also has a collection of comics and old books. He is dedicated to improving education and women's role in Turkish society through support of various NGos and charities.

Currently Participated Live Broadcasts as a Speaker

Conferences & Events Participated as a Speaker

References 

Turkish chief executives
Georgia Tech alumni
Rice University alumni
Jesse H. Jones Graduate School of Business alumni
1967 births
Living people